Joseph Ward is a marble sculpture depicting the American educator of the same name by Bruno Beghé, installed United States Capitol Visitor Center's Emancipation Hall, in Washington, D.C., as part of the National Statuary Hall Collection. The statue was donated by the U.S. state of South Dakota in 1963.

References

External links

 

1963 establishments in Washington, D.C.
1963 sculptures
Marble sculptures in Washington, D.C.
Monuments and memorials in Washington, D.C.
Ward, Joseph
Sculptures of men in Washington, D.C.